Aznalcóllar is a city located in the province of Seville, southern Spain. It is located at the feet of the Sierra Morena.

Aznalcollar mine 

The Boliden mine produces around 125,000 tonnes of zinc and 2.9 million ounces of silver per year.

The residue pool at the mine burst in late April 1998 sending a toxic wave into Doñana National Park, one of Europe's largest nature reserves. The spill caused damage over an area of around 30-kilometres, destroying rare plant and wildlife.

References

External links

Aznalcóllar - Sistema de Información Multiterritorial de Andalucía

Municipalities of the Province of Seville